AM-855 (part of the AM cannabinoid series) is an analgesic drug which is a cannabinoid agonist. It is a derivative of Δ8Tetrahydrocannabinol with a conformationally restricted side chain which has been bound into a fourth ring fused to the aromatic A-ring of the cannabinoid skeleton. AM-855 is an agonist at both CB1 and CB2 with moderate selectivity for CB1, with a Ki of 22.3 nM at CB1 and 58.6 nM at CB2.

References

AM cannabinoids
Benzochromenes
Phenols